The 2019 Bremen state election was held on 26 May 2019 to elect the members of the Bürgerschaft of Bremen, as well as the city councils of Bremen and Bremerhaven. The election took place on the same day as the 2019 European Parliament election.

The opposition Christian Democratic Union (CDU) became the largest party in the Bürgerschaft, while the Social Democratic Party (SPD) fell to second place. The Greens and The Left also recorded small upswings.

Despite winning a narrow plurality, the CDU was opposed by a left-wing majority in the Bürgerschaft. Incumbent Mayor Carsten Sieling resigned after the election, and was succeeded by fellow SPD member Andreas Bovenschulte, who formed a three-party coalition government between the SPD, Greens, and Left. This was the first time that The Left had been involved in a government in western Germany.

Parties
The table below lists parties represented in the previous Bürgerschaft of Bremen.

Opinion polls

Mayor polling

Preferred coalition

Election result

| align=center colspan=11| 
|-
! rowspan="2" colspan="2" | Party
! rowspan="2" | Votes
! rowspan="2" | %
! rowspan="2" | +/-
! colspan="2" | Seats
! rowspan="2" | Totalseats
! rowspan="2" | +/-
! rowspan="2" | Seats %
|-
! Bremen
! Bremerhaven
|-
| bgcolor=| 
| align=left | Christian Democratic Union (CDU)
| align=right| 391,709
| align=right| 26.7
| align=right| 4.3
| align=right| 20
| align=right| 4
| align=right| 24
| align=right| 4
| align=right| 28.6
|-
| bgcolor=| 
| align=left | Social Democratic Party (SPD)
| align=right| 366,375
| align=right| 24.9
| align=right| 7.9
| align=right| 19
| align=right| 4
| align=right| 23
| align=right| 7
| align=right| 27.4
|-
| bgcolor=| 
| align=left | Alliance 90/The Greens (Grüne)
| align=right| 256,181
| align=right| 17.4
| align=right| 2.3
| align=right| 13
| align=right| 3
| align=right| 16
| align=right| 2
| align=right| 19.0
|-
| bgcolor=| 
| align=left | The Left (Linke)
| align=right| 166,378
| align=right| 11.3
| align=right| 1.8
| align=right| 9
| align=right| 1
| align=right| 10
| align=right| 2
| align=right| 11.9
|-
| bgcolor=| 
| align=left | Alternative for Germany (AfD)
| align=right| 89,939
| align=right| 6.1
| align=right| 0.6
| align=right| 4
| align=right| 1
| align=right| 5
| align=right| 1
| align=right| 6.0
|-
| bgcolor=| 
| align=left | Free Democratic Party (FDP)
| align=right| 87,420
| align=right| 5.9
| align=right| 0.7
| align=right| 4
| align=right| 1
| align=right| 5
| align=right| 1
| align=right| 6.0
|-
| bgcolor=| 
| align=left | Citizens in Rage (BiW)
| align=right| 35,808
| align=right| 2.4
| align=right| 0.8
| align=right| 0
| align=right| 1
| align=right| 1
| align=right| 0
| align=right| 1.2
|-
! colspan=8|
|-
| bgcolor=| 
| align=left | Die PARTEI (PARTEI)
| align=right| 24,433
| align=right| 1.7
| align=right| 0.2
| align=right| 0
| align=right| 0
| align=right| 0
| align=right| ±0
| align=right| 0
|-
| bgcolor=|
| align=left | Free Voters (FW)
| align=right| 14,205
| align=right| 1.0
| align=right| 1.0
| align=right| 0
| align=right| 0
| align=right| 0
| align=right| ±0
| align=right| 0
|-
| bgcolor=|
| align=left | Pirate Party Germany (Piraten)
| align=right| 14,143
| align=right| 1.0
| align=right| 0.5
| align=right| 0
| align=right| 0
| align=right| 0
| align=right| ±0
| align=right| 0
|-
| style="background:#0085B9;" |
| align=left | Party of Humanists (Humanists)
| align=right| 6,655
| align=right| 0.5
| align=right| 0.5
| align=right| 0
| align=right| 0
| align=right| 0
| align=right| ±0
| align=right| 0
|-
| bgcolor=|
| align=left | Basic Income Alliance (BGE)
| align=right| 5,970
| align=right| 0.4
| align=right| 0.4
| align=right| 0
| align=right| 0
| align=right| 0
| align=right| ±0
| align=right| 0
|-
| bgcolor=|
| align=left | V-Partei³ (V³)
| align=right| 4,277
| align=right| 0.3
| align=right| 0.3
| align=right| 0
| align=right| 0
| align=right| 0
| align=right| ±0
| align=right| 0
|-
| style="background:#FF7676;" |
| align=left | Welcome to Reality (WIR)
| align=right| 2,821
| align=right| 0.2
| align=right| 0.2
| align=right| 0
| align=right| 0
| align=right| 0
| align=right| ±0
| align=right| 0
|-
| style="background:#FF4C25;" |
| align=left | Human World (MW)
| align=right| 2,565
| align=right| 0.2
| align=right| 0.2
| align=right| 0
| align=right| 0
| align=right| 0
| align=right| ±0
| align=right| 0
|-
| bgcolor=|
| align=left | The Right (Right)
| align=right| 627
| align=right| 0.0
| align=right| 0.0
| align=right| 0
| align=right| 0
| align=right| 0
| align=right| ±0
| align=right| 0
|-
! align=right colspan=2| Total
! align=right| 1,469,506
! align=right| 100.0
! align=right| 
! align=right| 69
! align=right| 15
! align=right| 84
! align=right| 1
! align=right| 
|-
! align=right colspan=2| Voter turnout
! align=right| 
! align=right| 64.1
! align=right| 13.9
! align=right| 
! align=right| 
! align=right| 
! align=right| 
! align=right| 
|}

References

Elections in Bremen (state)
2019 elections in Germany